Fair Mount is a historic home located at Winchester, Virginia.  It was built about 1809 by Lewis Barnett for local merchant Joseph Tidball. It is a two-story, five bay, stuccoed stone dwelling, with -story flanking wings. The house exhibits elements of the Late Georgian style in its massing and elements of the Federal style in its detailing. It was remodeled in 1929 in the Colonial Revival Style and the formal
gardens and garage constructed.

It was added to the National Register of Historic Places in 2004. It is located in the Winchester Historic District.

References

External links
 

Houses on the National Register of Historic Places in Virginia
Georgian architecture in Virginia
Federal architecture in Virginia
Colonial Revival architecture in Virginia
Houses completed in 1809
Houses in Winchester, Virginia
National Register of Historic Places in Winchester, Virginia
Individually listed contributing properties to historic districts on the National Register in Virginia